is a Japanese former professional baseball pitcher. He has played in his entire career with the Nippon Professional Baseball (NPB) for the Saitama Seibu Lions.

Career
Saitama Seibu Lions selected Noda with the third selection in the 2015 NPB draft.

On June 28, 2016, Noda made his NPB debut.

On December 2, 2020, he become a free agent. On December 14, 2020, Noda announced his retirement.

Personal
His wife is a Japanese Voice actress Haruka Yoshimura.

References 

1993 births
Living people
Baseball people from Fukuoka Prefecture
Japanese baseball players
Nippon Professional Baseball pitchers
Saitama Seibu Lions players